Elaine Bernadette Lordan (born 15 December 1966) is a British former actress, best known for her role as 'Sugar Walls' in the comedy series Gimme Gimme Gimme and playing Lynne Hobbs in EastEnders from 2000–2004. Following several tragedies in her private life, Lordan withdrew from the public eye in 2008.

Career
Lordan is best known for her role as Lynne Hobbs in the BBC soap opera EastEnders, which she appeared in from 2000 until 2004. Following reports of drunken behaviour on and off the set, Lordan left the show in mid-2004. 
Before landing the role of Lynne Hobbs in EastEnders, Lordan worked as an aerobics instructor for 10 years.
In the early 80s, she appeared in the Grange Hill spin off series Tuckers Luck alongside future Eastenders co star Todd Carty. She played Tuckers girlfriend Michelle Passmore. She also appeared in TV comedy drama Minder as Trish, a despatcher, Gimme Gimme Gimme as Linda La Hughes's Eurovision-singing sister Sugar Walls in two episodes (1999: credited as Elaine Morgan, 2000).

She appeared on the fifth series of I'm a Celebrity, Get Me Out of Here! in November 2005, but within a day of arriving she passed out twice in the camp, and although the doctors found her to be in good health, she was removed from the jungle, the producers noting they had to consider if they felt the contestants were up to the rigors of the show. She was the first person to be voted off the 2007 series of Soapstar Superstar after performing Bonnie Tyler's "It's a Heartache".

Personal life 
She married Peter Manuel in December 2005, and her baby son died a few days later, aged one, having had surgery for a diaphragmatic hernia. This tragedy came just nine months after the suicide of her mother Bernie. She became pregnant again in 2007 but suffered a miscarriage. Fresh tragedy occurred in April 2008 when her father died from a degenerative illness.

She wrote about this part of her life in the book Whatever It Takes: A Story of Family Survival, published in 2008.

Filmography

References

External links

1966 births
Living people
English television actresses
English soap opera actresses
People from Islington (district)
I'm a Celebrity...Get Me Out of Here! (British TV series) participants